Bao Si was the concubine of the ancient Chinese sovereign King You of Zhou. She was considered one of the most beautiful Chinese women ever.

Life
Legends record that during the last years of the Xia dynasty, two dragons entered the palace of the king. When they left, the Xia king ordered that the dragon's saliva left inside the palace be kept in a wooden box. During the time of King Li of Zhou, he tried to open the box despite a taboo against such an act, since it had not been opened for more than a thousand years. The saliva accidentally spilled and transformed into a black lizard. The lizard crawled in front of a seven-year-old slave girl. Eight years later she became pregnant while still a virgin, and gave birth to a girl. The mother abandoned the baby, who was later adopted by a couple who escaped to the State of Bao and raised her to adulthood. She was later presented by the ruler of Bao to King You.

In 779 BC, Bao Si entered the palace and came into King You's favour. She bore him a son named Bofu. King You deposed Queen Shen (申后) and Crown Prince Yijiu. He made Bao Si the new queen and Bofu the new crown prince.

Bao Si was of a melancholy disposition so King You offered a thousand ounces of gold to anyone who could make her laugh. Someone at the court suggested lighting the warning beacons of Mount Li usually used to summon armies from the surrounding vassal states in times of danger. The nobles duly arrived at the court only to find themselves laughed at by Bao Si. Even after King You had impressed Bao Si, he continued to abuse his use of warning beacons and so lost the trust of the nobles.

Queen Shen's father the Marquess of Shen was upset by the deposition of his daughter and grandson Yijiu and mounted an attack on King You's palace in conjunction with Quanrong nomads. King You called for the nobles with the beacons but none came as they no longer trusted him. In the end, King You and Bofu were killed and Bao Si was captured at Xi (戲/戏) for the Quanrong leader. King You's death marks the end of the Western Zhou and the beginning of the Spring and Autumn period of the Eastern Zhou Dynasty.

After her capture, the Marquess of Shen managed to get Bao Si for himself. Bao Si accepted a bribe from him and leave the capital. Later, during another attack by Quanrong nomads, Bao Si was unable to escape and hanged herself. Her date of death is unknown.

The story of Bao Si and King You of Zhou is amongst the most well-known and iconic of love stories from ancient China, and serves not only as a demonstration of extreme love but also as a cautionary tale of how one beauty can topple a nation.

Through the few references available, it can be presumed that Bao Si was born in 792 BC (three years younger than King You) and died in 771 BC (assuming that her death happened by suicide shortly after the Quanrong attack).

See also
 Daji
 Four Beauties: Yang Guifei, Xi Shi, Wang Zhaojun, Diaochan

References

8th-century BC Chinese women
8th-century BC Chinese people
Zhou dynasty consorts
Zhou dynasty nobility